Anarsia elongata is a moth of the family Gelechiidae. It was described by Kyu-Tek Park in 1995. It is found in Taiwan and Thailand.

The wingspan is 14–15 mm.

References

elongata
Moths described in 1995
Moths of Asia